Pipe Creek Friends Meetinghouse is a historic Friends meeting house located at Union Bridge, Carroll County, Maryland, United States. It is a -story brick structure in Flemish bond on a stone foundation.  The meetinghouse was begun in 1771 and completed the next year.  A fire in October 1934 destroyed the interior, but the original benches were saved. The founders of the meetinghouse were immigrants from the north of Ireland. It was the Quaker meetinghouse attended by a great-grandfather of President Herbert Hoover.

The Pipe Creek Friends Meetinghouse was listed on the National Register of Historic Places in 1976.

References

External links
, including photo from 2006, at Maryland Historical Trust
Pipe Creek Friends homepage

Quaker meeting houses in Maryland
Churches in Carroll County, Maryland
Churches on the National Register of Historic Places in Maryland
Religious buildings and structures completed in 1771
Scotch-Irish American culture in Maryland
Union Bridge, Maryland
18th-century Quaker meeting houses
National Register of Historic Places in Carroll County, Maryland